The 1977 Navy Midshipmen football team represented the United States Naval Academy (USNA) as an independent during the 1977 NCAA Division I football season. The team was led by fifth-year head coach George Welsh.

Schedule

Personnel

Game summaries

References

Navy
Navy Midshipmen football seasons
Navy Midshipmen football